Asyraf Wajdi bin Dusuki (Jawi: أشراف وجدي دسوقي) (born 14 May 1976) is a Malaysian politician who has served as Chairman of the Majlis Amanah Rakyat (MARA) since March 2023. He served as Deputy Minister in the Prime Minister's Department in charge of Islamic affairs in the Barisan Nasional (BN) administration under former Prime Minister Najib Razak and former Minister Jamil Khir Baharom from July 2015 to the collapse of the BN administration in May 2018 as well as Senator from 2014 to 2018. He is a member of the United Malays National Organisation (UMNO), a component party of the BN coalition. He also served as the 14th Youth Chief of UMNO from June 2018 to March 2023 and President of the Islamic Da'wah Foundation of Malaysia from June 2013 to July 2015.

Education 
Prior to entering International Islamic University Malaysia (IIUM), Asyraf was a student of Sekolah Menengah Agama Persekutuan Labu. In 2000, he graduated from IIUM with a bachelor's degree in accounting. He, then, furthered his studies in Loughborough University, where he obtain two degrees: Master of Science with Distinction (Islamic Economics, Banking and Finance), and Doctor of Philosophy (Islamic Banking and Finance).

Career 
Prior to taking political office, he served IIUM as a lecturer and, then, an assistant professor of its Kulliyyah of Economics and Management Sciences. He also served the International Shariah Research Academy for Islamic Finance as Head of Research Affairs, and International Centre for Education in Islamic Finance as an associate professor.

On 3 June 2013, Prime Minister Najib Razak appointed him as the President of Islamic Da'wah Foundation of Malaysia (YADIM).

On 26 May 2014, the Yang di-Pertuan Agong admitted him to the Parliament as a senator, which paved the way for Najib to promote him as a Deputy Federal Minister in charge of Islamic affairs in July 2015. As such, he takes charge of YADIM, Islamic Economic Development Foundation of Malaysia (YaPEIM), Tabung Haji, TV Alhijrah, Institute of Islamic Understanding (IKIM) and Department of Waqf, Zakat and Hajj (JAWHAR).

When a picture from a gathering of the Atheist Republic Consulate of Kuala Lumpur was posted on Atheist Republic's Facebook page in August 2017, Asyraf ordered an inquiry into whether anyone in the picture had apostatised from Islam or had 'spread atheism' to any Muslims present, both of which are illegal in Malaysia.

He has openly expressed his extreme views against Najib Razak, Asyraf stated that Najib was 'unconstitutional' and even suggested it is an offence under the Sedition Act. However, he reported that Facebook had rejected a joint government and Malaysian Communications and Multimedia Commission demand to shut down Atheist Republic's page and similar atheist pages, because the pages did not violate any of the company's community standards.

Family 
Asyraf is the third son of Dusuki Ahmad, who was once President of YADIM, and Nik Nooraini Nik Yahya. He is married with Nurdianawati Irwani Abdullah.

Politic

Prior GE14 
Prior to GE14, he held the position of UMNO Supreme Council Member and Chairman of the Kelantan State UMNO Liaison Body Religious Bureau.

he also served as a Committee Member of the UMNO Malaysian NGO-GCOC Liaison Bureau and also the Advisory Panel of the An-Nur Squad of the UMNO Women's Movement.

UMNO YOUTH CHIEF 
He has been the UMNO Youth Movement Chief since 2018. He is the first UMNO Youth Chief after Barisan Nasional lost in GE14.

Skuad Sabil Malaysia 
As the Malaysian UMNO Youth Chief, he established SKUAD SABIL MALAYSIA which is the uniformed body of Malaysian UMNO youth.

Skuad Sabil Malaysia was officially established on 28 August 2019 by Datuk Seri Dr. Ahmad Zahid Hamidi, President of UMNO.

Election results

Honour
  :
  Knight Companion of the Order of the Crown of Pahang (DIMP) – Dato' (2014)

References

External links 
 Personal website

1976 births
Living people
Academic staff of the International Islamic University Malaysia
Malaysian people of Malay descent
Malaysian Muslims
United Malays National Organisation politicians
Members of the Dewan Negara
International Islamic University Malaysia alumni
Critics of atheism